Voices of Angels is the eleventh studio album released by the group Celtic Woman.

Background
The album was recorded at Cauldron Studios in Dublin, Ireland with the seventy-two-piece RTÉ National Symphony Orchestra of Ireland in August 2016, and includes a mixture of original songs, new covers and re-arranged versions of previous Celtic Woman covers.

Voices of Angels features vocalists Susan McFadden, Mairéad Carlin, Éabha McMahon, and fiddler and harpist Tara McNeill, with a guest appearance by former member and current vocal director Méav Ní Mhaolchatha. This is the group's first album to feature McNeill as their newest member (at the time).

A digital-download copy of the album was made available as part of a ticket presale for the group's 2017 Voices of Angels tour in the United States, Canada, Japan, Europe, and Australia.

Track listing 

Notes
 Tracks 14 and 15 were not available on digital-download versions of the album.
 Tracks 2, 7 and 15 orchestrated by Paul Campbell.

Notes
 Tracks 2, 7 and 16 orchestrated by Paul Campbell.
 Track 15 was originally released on the original Celtic Woman album.
 Track 19 was originally released on the album A Christmas Celebration.
 Tracks 15 and 19 were produced by David Downes.

Notes
 Tracks 2, 5 and 11 orchestrated by Paul Campbell.
 Track 12 was originally released on the album Destiny.
 Track 13 was originally released on the album A New Journey and performed by Lisa Kelly. The arrangement featured, performed by Susan McFadden, appeared on the album Emerald - Musical Gems.
 Tracks 14-16 were originally released on the original Celtic Woman album.
 Track 17 was originally released on the album Believe.
 Track 18 was originally released on the album A New Journey.
 Track 19 was originally released on the album Songs from the Heart.
 Track 20 was originally released on the album A New Journey with vocals by Lisa Kelly. The arrangement featured, with vocals by Susan McFadden, appeared on the album Emerald - Musical Gems.
 Tracks 13-20 were produced by David Downes.

Personnel

Celtic Woman
Mairéad Carlin – vocals
Susan McFadden – vocals
Éabha McMahon – vocals
Tara McNeill – fiddle, Irish harp
Méav Ní Mhaolchatha – vocals
The Orchestra of Ireland
Joe Csibi – orchestra contractor, conductor
Celtic Voices Choir
Paul McGough – choir co-ordinator
Production
Gavin Murphy – musical director, album producer, arrangements, orchestrations
Méav Ní Mhaolchatha – vocal director
Paul Campbell – additional orchestrations (tracks 2, 7 and 15)
David Montuy, David McCune – additional recording and editing
Tim Martin – recording, mixing, orchestra and choir recording
Mark Thomas Dwyer, Ciaran Byrne – orchestra recording
Rachel Conlan – choir recording
Andy Walter – album mastering

Charts

Weekly charts

Year-end charts

This was the first Celtic Woman album to appear on the Billboard Classical Albums chart. The album also debuted at No. 1 on the Billboard Biz Classical Crossover chart.

The album appeared on the Billboard World Albums chart for 48 consecutive weeks. As of December 27, 2017, the album had spent 53 weeks on the chart, including 14 weeks at No. 1.

References

2016 albums
Celtic Woman albums
Manhattan Records albums